The 2009 Florida Marlins season was the 17th season for the Major League Baseball franchise. The Marlins played their home games at Sun Life Stadium. Fredi González returned for his third straight season as manager. The Marlins failed to make the playoffs for the sixth consecutive season.  This would also mark the Marlins last winning season until 2020.

Regular season

April 
Opening Day showcased the Marlins′ new emphasis on pitching and speed, although several home runs were hit too. New leadoff hitter Emilio Bonifacio had three stolen bases and an inside-the-park home run, going 4-for-5. A grand slam by Hanley Ramírez, and homers by Jorge Cantú and Jeremy Hermida capped a spectacular performance in a 12–6 win over the Washington Nationals. The 12 runs set a franchise record for most runs scored on Opening Day. Following an opening series sweep of Washington, the Marlins won two of three games against the New York Mets. Next, Florida had a nine-game road trip, visiting Atlanta, Washington, and Pittsburgh for three games each. The Marlins swept both the Braves and Nationals to earn a franchise-best 11—1 record to open a season. But then they stumbled in Pittsburgh, losing all three games to the Pirates. Then the Marlins returned home to meet the Phillies, and lost all three games there too. In the final game against Philadelphia, outfielder Cody Ross pitched an inning of relief, becoming the first Marlins position player to pitch since Jason Wood did so in 2007. The Marlins closed April with three straight wins on the road.

May
The Marlins opened the month by losing the final three games of a four-game series at the Chicago Cubs. This was the beginning of one of the worst months in Marlins history going 5—20. Ricky Nolasco never returned to his 2008 form and was sent down to AAA. Worse yet, their number three starter Aníbal Sánchez got injured and the Marlins experimented with different pitchers including John Koronka, Graham Taylor, and even tried starting relievers Hayden Penn and Burke Badenhop before finally settling for Sean West. For the second time in 2009 a position player, Ross Gload pitched a hitless 9th inning in a 15—2 loss to the Tampa Bay Rays. After being 11—1 near the end of April the Marlins finished May with a 23—28 record.

June
In June the Marlins slowly were able to climb back to a 40—39 record.  Rookie pitcher Sean West went into the seventh inning against his childhood idol Randy Johnson and the San Francisco Giants with a no-hitter before Édgar Rentería hit a single. and Ricky Nolasco returned from the Minors and was better than ever.  Hanley Ramírez started to play like an MVP, by hitting 2 grand slams in one series against the Baltimore Orioles, his second and third of the year, then continued to have RBIs for 10 straight games into July 2 for a Florida Marlins franchise record.

July
In the beginning of July Hanley Ramírez was voted as the starting shortstop for the National League in the 2009 MLB All-Star Game. Teammate and pitcher Josh Johnson joined him but was not named a starter. At the All-Star Game, Ramírez went 0 for 3 with 3 ground balls. Johnson did not get the opportunity to pitch. Coming out of the All-Star Break, the Marlins ran in the Philadelphia Phillies with a four-game series. Since the 3rd game got rained out, they only lost all 3 games. No. 5 starter Sean West was sent to the minors and Rick VandenHurk was called up to make his 2009 Marlins debut. Also, their No. 4 starter Andrew Miller was sent down and Gaby Sánchez joined the team.

Season standings

Record vs. opponents

Game log 

|- bgcolor="ffbbbb"
|- align="center" bgcolor="bbffbb"
| 1 || April 6 || Nationals || 12–6 || Nolasco (1–0) || Lannan (0–1) || || 34,323 || 1–0
|- align="center" bgcolor="bbffbb"
| 2 || April 7 || Nationals || 8–3 || Johnson (1–0) || Olsen (0–1) || || 11,124 || 2–0
|- align="center" bgcolor="bbffbb"
| 3 || April 8 || Nationals || 6–4 || Volstad (1–0) || Cabrera (0–1) || Lindstrom (1) || 13,308 || 3–0
|- align="center" bgcolor="bbffbb"
| 4 || April 10 || Mets || 5–4 || Lindstrom (1–0) || Feliciano (0–1) || || 24,070 || 4–0
|- align="center" bgcolor="ffbbbb"
| 5 || April 11 || Mets || 8–4 || Hernández (1–0) || Nolasco (1–1) || || 39,412 || 4–1
|- align="center" bgcolor="bbffbb"
| 6 || April 12 || Mets || 2–1 || Johnson (2–0) || Santana (1–1) || || 18,109 || 5–1
|- align="center" bgcolor="bbffbb"
| 7 || April 14 || @ Braves || 5–1 || Volstad (2–0) || Vázquez (0–1) || || 16,293 || 6–1
|- align="center" bgcolor="bbffbb"
| 8 || April 15 || @ Braves || 10–4 || Penn (1–0) || Moylan (0–1) || || 19,204 || 7–1
|- align="center" bgcolor="bbffbb"
| 9 || April 16 || @ Braves || 6–2 || Sánchez (1–0) || Kawakami (1–1) || || 21,072 || 8–1
|- align="center" bgcolor="bbffbb"
| 10 || April 17 || @ Nationals || 3 – 2 (10) || Núñez (1–0) || Rivera (0–2) || Lindstrom (2) || 19,026 || 9–1
|- align="center" bgcolor="bbffbb"
| 11 || April 18 || @ Nationals || 9 – 6 (11) || Calero (1–0) || Tavárez (0–1) || || 19,864 || 10–1
|- align="center" bgcolor="bbffbb"
| 12 || April 19 || @ Nationals || 7–4 || Núñez (2–0) || Rivera (0–3) || Lindstrom (3) || 16,974 || 11–1
|- align="center" bgcolor="ffbbbb"
| 13 || April 20 || @ Pirates || 8–0 || Ohlendorf (1–2) || Miller (0–1) || || 8,790 || 11–2
|- align="center" bgcolor="ffbbbb"
| 14 || April 21 || @ Pirates || 3–2 || Karstens (1–0) || Sánchez (1–1) || Capps (4) || 9,917 || 11–3
|- align="center" bgcolor="ffbbbb"
| 15 || April 22 || @ Pirates || 7–4 || Maholm (3–0) || Nolasco (1–2) || Capps (5) || 10,655 || 11–4
|- align="center" bgcolor="ffbbbb"
| 16 || April 24 || Phillies || 7–3 || Condrey (3–0) || Lindstrom (1–1) || || 29,032 || 11–5
|- align="center" bgcolor="ffbbbb"
| 17 || April 25 || Phillies || 6 – 4 (10) || Madson (2–1) || Kensing (0–1) || Lidge (4) || 26,412 || 11–6
|- align="center" bgcolor="ffbbbb"
| 18 || April 26 || Phillies || 13–2 || Moyer (3–1) || Taylor (0–1) || || 17,177 || 11–7
|- align="center" bgcolor="ffbbbb"
| 19 || April 27 || @ Mets || 7–1 || Maine (1–2) || Sánchez (1–2) || || 38,573 || 11–8
|- align="center" bgcolor="bbffbb"
| 20 || April 28 || @ Mets || 7–4 || Badenhop (1–0) || Green (0–1) || Lindstrom (4) || 38,546 || 12–8
|- align="center" bgcolor="bbffbb"
| 21 || April 29 || @ Mets || 4–3 || Pinto (1–0) || Putz (1–2) || Lindstrom (5) || 39,339 || 13–8
|- align="center" bgcolor="bbffbb"
| 22 || April 30 || @ Cubs || 8 – 2 (10) || Pinto (2–0) || Heilman (2–1) || || 37,956 || 14–8
|-

|- bgcolor="ffbbbb"
|- align="center" bgcolor="ffbbbb"
| 23 || May 1 || @ Cubs || 8–6 || Patton (1–1) || Badenhop (1–1) || Gregg (2) || 38,336 || 14–9
|- align="center" bgcolor="ffbbbb"
| 24 || May 2 || @ Cubs || 6–1 || Lilly (3–2) || Sánchez (1–3) || || 40,083 || 14–10
|- align="center" bgcolor="ffbbbb"
| 25 || May 3 || @ Cubs || 6–4 || Zambrano (3–1) || Nolasco (1–3) || Gregg (3) || 40,457 || 14–11
|- align="center" bgcolor="bbffbb"
| 26 || May 4 || Reds || 3 – 2 (14) || Badenhop (2–1) || Herrera (0–1) || || 10,825 || 15–11
|- align="center" bgcolor="ffbbbb"
| 27 || May 5 || Reds || 7–0 || Vólquez (4–2) || Volstad (2–1) || || 11,087 || 15–12
|- align="center" bgcolor="ffbbbb"
| 28 || May 6 || Braves || 8–6 || Lowe (4–1) || Taylor (0–2) || González (4) || 12,725 || 15–13
|- align="center" bgcolor="ffbbbb"
| 29 || May 7 || Braves || 4–2 || Jurrjens (3–2) || Sánchez (1–4) || González (5) || 17,759 || 15–14
|- align="center" bgcolor="bbffbb"
| 30 || May 8 || @ Rockies || 8–3 || Nolasco (2–3) || Hammel (0–1) || || 27,398 || 16–14
|- align="center" bgcolor="bbffbb"
| 31 || May 9 || @ Rockies || 3–1 || Johnson (3–0) || de la Rosa (0–3) || Lindstrom (6) || 28,227 || 17–14
|- align="center" bgcolor="ffbbbb"
| 32 || May 10 || @ Rockies || 3–2 || Cook (2–1) || Volstad (2–2) || Street (4) || 30,197 || 17–15
|- align="center" bgcolor="ffbbbb"
| 33 || May 12 || @ Brewers || 6–3 || Parra (2–4) || Koronka (0–1) || Hoffman (6) || 29,331 || 17–16
|- align="center" bgcolor="ffbbbb"
| 34 || May 13 || @ Brewers || 8–6 || Looper (3–2) || Nolasco (2–4) || Hoffman (7) || 32,825 || 17–17
|- align="center" bgcolor="ffbbbb"
| 35 || May 14 || @ Brewers || 5–3 || Bush (2–0) || Badenhop (2–2) || Hoffman (8) || 35,658 || 17–18
|- align="center" bgcolor="ffbbbb"
| 36 || May 15 || Dodgers || 6–4 || Weaver (2–0) || Volstad (2–3) || Broxton (9) || 20,039 || 17–19
|- align="center" bgcolor="bbffbb"
| 37 || May 16 || Dodgers || 6–3 || Miller (1–1) || Weaver (2–1) || Lindstrom (7) || 25,132 || 18–19
|- align="center" bgcolor="ffbbbb"
| 38 || May 17 || Dodgers || 12–5 || Kershaw (2–3) || Koronka (0–2) || || 16,332 || 18–20
|- align="center" bgcolor="bbbbbb"
| || May 18 || Diamondbacks || colspan=6 |Postponed (rain) Rescheduled May 20, (doubleheader)
|- align="center" bgcolor="ffbbbb"
| 39 || May 19 || Diamondbacks || 5–3 || Garland (4–2) || Johnson (3–1) || Qualls (9) || 10,131 || 18–21
|- align="center" bgcolor="bbffbb"
| 40 || May 20 || Diamondbacks || 8–6 || Volstad (3–3) || Davis (2–6) || Lindstrom (8) || || 19–21
|- align="center" bgcolor="ffbbbb"
| 41 || May 20 || Diamondbacks || 11 – 9 (13) || Qualls (1–0) || Núñez (2–1) || Rauch (1) || 14,426 || 19–22
|- align="center" bgcolor="ffbbbb"
| 42 || May 21 || Diamondbacks || 4–3 || Zavada (1–0) || Martínez (0–1) || Qualls (10) || 12,045 || 19–23
|- align="center" bgcolor="ffbbbb"
| 43 || May 22 || Rays || 15–2 || Sonnanstine (3–4) || Nolasco (2–5) || || 16,226 || 19–24
|- align="center" bgcolor="ffbbbb"
| 44 || May 23 || Rays || 10–3 || Balfour (2–0) || Núñez (2–2) || || 20,253 || 19–25
|- align="center" bgcolor="bbffbb"
| 45 || May 24 || Rays || 5 – 4 (11) || Sanches (1–0) || Cormier (0–1) || || 12,839 || 20–25
|- align="center" bgcolor="bbffbb"
| 46 || May 25 || @ Phillies || 5–3 || Volstad (4–3) || Moyer (3–5) || Lindstrom (9) || 45,186 || 21–25
|- align="center" bgcolor="ffbbbb"
| 47 || May 26 || @ Phillies || 5–3 || Blanton (3–3) || Miller (1–2) || Lidge (9) || 42,249 || 21–26
|- align="center" bgcolor="bbffbb"
| 48 || May 27 || @ Phillies || 6–2 || Badenhop (3–2) || Myers (4–3) || || 45,256 || 22–26
|- align="center" bgcolor="ffbbbb"
| 49 || May 29 || @ Mets || 2 – 1 (11) || Feliciano (2–1) || Sanches (1–1) || || 40,677 || 22–27
|- align="center" bgcolor="bbffbb"
| 50 || May 30 || @ Mets || 7–3 || Johnson (4–1) || Redding (0–2) || Núñez (1) || 40,727 || 23–27
|- align="center" bgcolor="ffbbbb"
| 51 || May 31 || @ Mets || 3–2 || Maine (5–3) || Volstad (4–4) || Rodríguez (14) || 40,482 || 23–28
|-

|- bgcolor="ffbbbb"
|- align="center" bgcolor="bbffbb"
| 52 || June 1 || Brewers || 7–4 || Martínez (1–0) || Julio (1–1) || Lindstrom (10) || 10,509 || 24–28
|- align="center" bgcolor="bbffbb"
| 53 || June 2 || Brewers || 10–3 || Badenhop (4–2) || Parra (3–7) || || 10,831 || 25–28
|- align="center" bgcolor="ffbbbb"
| 54 || June 3 || Brewers || 9–6 || McClung (3–1) || West (0–1) || Hoffman (14) || 13,012 || 25–29
|- align="center" bgcolor="bbffbb"
| 55 || June 4 || Brewers || 4–3 || Johnson (5–1) || Bush (3–2) || Lindstrom (11) || 11,623 || 26–29
|- align="center" bgcolor="ffbbbb"
| 56 || June 5 || Giants || 2–1 || Zito (2–6) || Volstad (4–5) || Wilson (14) || 12,841 || 26–30
|- align="center" bgcolor="bbffbb"
| 57 || June 6 || Giants || 5–4 || Miller (2–2) || Sánchez (2–5) || Núñez (2) || 16,294 || 27–30
|- align="center" bgcolor="ffbbbb"
| 58 || June 7 || Giants || 3–2 || Lincecum (5–1) || Nolasco (2–6) || Wilson (15) || 11,505 || 27–31
|- align="center" bgcolor="bbffbb"
| 59 || June 8 || Giants || 4–0 || West (1–1) || Johnson (5–5) || || 12,068 || 28–31
|- align="center" bgcolor="bbffbb"
| 60 || June 9 || Cardinals || 4–3 || Lindstrom (2–1) || Motte (2–2) || || 13,103 || 29–31
|- align="center" bgcolor="ffbbbb"
| 61 || June 10 || Cardinals || 13–4 || Wainwright (6–4) || Volstad (4–6) || || 14,624 || 29–32
|- align="center" bgcolor="ffbbbb"
| 62 || June 11 || Cardinals || 6–5 || Miller (2–0) || Núñez (2–3) || Franklin (14) || 19,112 || 29–33
|- align="center" bgcolor="bbffbb"
| 63 || June 12 || @ Blue Jays || 7–3 || Meyer (1–0) || League (1–3) || || 17,922 || 30–33
|- align="center" bgcolor="bbffbb"
| 64 || June 13 || @ Blue Jays || 6–5 || West (2–1) || Janssen (2–3) || Lindstrom (12) || 20,634 || 31–33
|- align="center" bgcolor="bbffbb"
| 65 || June 14 || @ Blue Jays || 11–3 || Johnson (6–1) || Tallet (4–4) || || 20,985 || 32–33
|- align="center" bgcolor="ffbbbb"
| 66 || June 16 || @ Red Sox || 8–2 || Wakefield (9–3) || Volstad (4–7) || || 38,149 || 32–34
|- align="center" bgcolor="ffbbbb"
| 67 || June 17 || @ Red Sox || 6–1 || Penny (6–2) || Miller (2–3) || || 38,196 || 32–35
|- align="center" bgcolor="bbffbb"
| 68 || June 18 || @ Red Sox || 2–1 (6) || Nolasco (3–6) || Lester (5–6) || || 37,577 || 33–35
|- align="center" bgcolor="ffbbbb"
| 69 || June 19 || Yankees || 5–1 || Pettitte (7–3) || West (2–2) || || 35,027 || 33–36
|- align="center" bgcolor="bbffbb"
| 70 || June 20 || Yankees || 2–1 || Johnson (7–1) || Burnett (5–4) || Lindstrom (13) || 46,427 || 34–36
|- align="center" bgcolor="bbffbb"
| 71 || June 21 || Yankees || 6–5 || Volstad (5–7) || Tomko (0–2) || Lindstrom (14) || 35,827 || 35–36
|- align="center" bgcolor="bbffbb"
| 72 || June 23 || Orioles || 7–6 (12) || Badenhop (5–2) || Bass (4–2) || || 10,222 || 36–36
|- align="center" bgcolor="bbffbb"
| 73 || June 24 || Orioles || 5–2 || Nolasco (4–6) || Berken (1–4) || Meyer (1) || 12,469 || 37–36
|- align="center" bgcolor="bbffbb"
| 74 || June 25 || Orioles || 11–3 || West (3–2) || Hill (3–2) || || 12,822 || 38–36
|- align="center" bgcolor="ffbbbb"
|| 75 || June 26 || @ Rays || 7–3 || Howell (3–2) || Pinto (2–1) || || 20,972 || 38–37
|- align="center" bgcolor="ffbbbb"
| 76 || June 27 || @ Rays || 3–2 || Howell (4–2) || Badenhop (5–3) || || 35,790 || 38–38
|- align="center" bgcolor="ffbbbb"
| 77 || June 28 || @ Rays || 5–2 || Price (2–2) || Miller (2–4) || || 29,459 || 38–39
|- align="center" bgcolor="bbffbb"
| 78 || June 29 || Nationals || 4–2 || Nolasco (5–6) || Villone (3–5) || Núñez (3) || 10,623 || 39–39
|- align="center" bgcolor="bbffbb"
| 79 || June 30 || Nationals || 7–5 (7) || Pinto (3–1) || Beimel (0–4) || || 11,821 || 40–39
|-

|- bgcolor="ffbbbb"
|- align="center" bgcolor="bbffbb"
| 80 || July 1 || Nationals || 5–3 || Meyer (2–0) || Tavárez (3–6) || Núñez (4) || 27,032 || 41–39
|- align="center" bgcolor="ffbbbb"
| 81 || July 3 || Pirates || 7–4 || Morton (1–1)|| Volstad (5–8) || || 16,114 ||41–40
|- align="center" bgcolor="bbffbb"
| 82 || July 4 || Pirates || 5–3 || Miller (3–4)|| Duke || Meyer (2) || 25,303 || 42–40
|- align="center" bgcolor="bbffbb"
| 83 || July 5 || Pirates || 5–0 || Nolasco (6–6) || Ohlendorf || || 13,287 || 43–40
|- align="center" bgcolor="ffbbbb"
| 84 || July 6 || @ Giants || 5–4 || Cain (10–2) || West (3–3) || Brian Wilson (22) || 26,995 || 43–41
|- align="center" bgcolor="ffbbbb"
| 85 || July 7 || @ Giants || 3–0 || Zito (5–8) || Johnson (7–2) || Romo (1) || 27,799 || 43–42
|- align="center" bgcolor="bbffbb"
| 86 || July 8 || @ Giants || 7–0 || Volstad (6–8) || Sadowski (2–1) || || 34,157 || 44–42
|- align="center" bgcolor="bbffbb"
| 87 || July 9 || @ Diamondbacks || 14–7 || Calero (2–0) || Schoeneweis (1–1) || || 21,558 || 45–42
|- align="center" bgcolor="ffbbbb"
| 88 || July 10 || @ Diamondbacks || 8–0 || Haren (9–5) || Nolasco (6–7) || || 21,307 || 45–43
|- align="center" bgcolor="ffbbbb"
| 89 || July 11 || @ Diamondbacks || 5–1 || Garland (5–8) || West (3–4) || || 29,477 || 45–44
|- align="center" bgcolor="bbffbb"
| 90 || July 12 || @ Diamondbacks || 8–1 || Johnson (8–2) || Davis (4–9) || || 28,617 || 46–44
|- align="center" bgcolor="ffbbbb"
| 91 || July 16 || Phillies || 4–0 || Moyer (9–6) || Volstad (6–9) || || 15,171 || 46–45
|- align="center" bgcolor="ffbbbb"
| 92 || July 17 || Phillies || 6–5 (12) || Condrey (5–2) || Badenhop (5–4) || Lidge (19) || 22,891 || 46–46
|- align="center" bgcolor="bbbbbb"
| || July 18 || Phillies || colspan=6 |Postponed (rain) Rescheduled Sep 22, (doubleheader)
|- align="center" bgcolor="ffbbbb"
| 93 || July 19 || Phillies || 5–0 || Happ (7–0) || Miller (3–5) || || 15,033 || 46–47
|- align="center" bgcolor="bbffbb"
| 94 || July 20 || @ Padres || 3–2 || VandenHurk (1–0) || Burke (2–2) || Núñez (5) || 17,184 || 47–47
|- align="center" bgcolor="bbffbb"
| 95 || July 21 || @ Padres || 3–2 || Volstad (7–9) || Gaudin (4–9) || Núñez (6) || 20,311 || 48–47
|- align="center" bgcolor="bbffbb"
| 96 || July 22 || @ Padres || 5–0 || Nolasco (7–7) || Geer (1–6) || || 16,450 || 49–47
|- align="center" bgcolor="bbffbb"
| 97 || July 24 || @ Dodgers || 6–3 || Johnson (9–2) || McDonald (2–2) || Núñez (7) || 51,565 || 50–47
|- align="center" bgcolor="ffbbbb"
| 98 || July 25 || @ Dodgers || 4–3 || Broxton (7–0) || Meyer (2–1) || || 50,248 || 50–48
|- align="center" bgcolor="bbffbb"
| 99 || July 26 || @ Dodgers || 8–6 || Volstad (8–9) || Schmidt (1–1) || || 48,597 || 51–48
|- align="center" bgcolor="bbffbb"
| 100 || July 28 || Braves || 4–3 || Núñez (3–3) || Soriano (1–2) || || 13,128 || 52–48
|- align="center" bgcolor="bbffbb"
| 101 || July 29 || Braves || 6–3 || Johnson (10–2) || Kawakami (5–8) || Núñez (8) || 13,518 || 53–48
|- align="center" bgcolor="ffbbbb"
| 102 || July 30 || Braves || 6 – 3 (10) || Moylan (3–2) || Ayala (1–3) || Soriano (15) || 14,226 || 53–49
|- align="center" bgcolor="bbffbb"
| 103 || July 31 || Cubs || 5–2 || Donnelly (1–0) || Mármol (2–2) || Núñez (9) || 25,024 || 54–49
|-

|- bgcolor="ffbbbb"
|- align="center" bgcolor="ffbbbb"
| 104 || August 1 || Cubs || 9–8 (10) || Gregg (4–2) || Núñez (3–4) || Heilman (1) || 35,811 || 54–50
|- align="center" bgcolor="bbffbb"
| 105 || August 2 || Cubs || 3–2 || Donnelly (2–0) || Gregg (4–3) || || 25,969 || 55–50
|- align="center" bgcolor="ffbbbb"
| 106 || August 4 || @ Nationals || 6–4 || Villone (4–5) || Calero (2–1) || MacDougal (9) || 19,828 || 55–51
|- align="center" bgcolor="ffbbbb"
| 107 || August 5 || @ Nationals || 5–4 || Lannan (8–8) || VandenHurk (1–1) || MacDougal (10) || 18,312 || 55–52
|- align="center" bgcolor="ffbbbb"
| 108 || August 6 || @ Nationals || 12–8 || Sosa (1–0) || Ayala (1–4) || || 23,691 || 55–53
|- align="center" bgcolor="bbffbb"
| 109 || August 7 || @ Phillies || 3–2 || Nolasco (8–7) || Blanton (7–7) || Núñez (10) || 45,114 || 56–53
|- align="center" bgcolor="bbffbb"
| 110 || August 8 || @ Phillies || 6–4 || Sanches (2–1) || Hamels (7–6) || Núñez (11) || 45,086 || 57–53
|- align="center" bgcolor="bbffbb"
| 111 || August 9 || @ Phillies || 12–3 || Johnson (11–2) || Moyer 10–9 || || 45,169 || 58–53
|- align="center" bgcolor="bbffbb"
| 112 || August 10 || Astros || 8–6 || VandenHurk (2–1) || Moehler (7–8) || Núñez (12) || 12,325 || 59–53
|- align="center" bgcolor="bbffbb"
| 113 || August 11 || Astros || 9 – 8 (11) || Sanches (3–1) || Wright (2–2) || || 13,312 || 60–53
|- align="center" bgcolor="ffbbbb"
| 114 || August 12 || Astros || 14–6 || Norris (3–0) || Nolasco (8–8) || || 21,122 || 60–54
|- align="center" bgcolor="bbffbb"
| 115 || August 13 || Astros || 9–2 || West (4–4) || Hampton (7–10) || || 14,047 || 61–54
|- align="center" bgcolor="bbffbb"
| 116 || August 14 || Rockies || 6–5 || Johnson (12–2) || Hammel (7–7) || Núñez (13) || 15,965 || 62–54
|- align="center" bgcolor="bbbbbb"
| || August 15 || Rockies || colspan=6 |Postponed (rain) Rescheduled Aug 16, (doubleheader, 2nd game)
|- align="center" bgcolor="bbffbb"
| 117 || August 16 || Rockies || 10–3 || Volstad (9–9) || Cook (10–5) || || || 63–54
|- align="center" bgcolor="ffbbbb"
| 118 || August 16 || Rockies || 7–3 || de la Rosa (11–8) || VandenHurk (2–2) || Street (29) || 20,089 || 63–55
|- align="center" bgcolor="bbffbb"
| 119 || August 18 || @ Astros || 6–2 || Nolasco (9–8) || Norris (3–1) || || 30,189 || 64–55
|- align="center" bgcolor="ffbbbb"
| 120 || August 19 || @ Astros || 6–3 || Gervacio (1–0) || West (4–5) || Valverde (17) || 30,101 || 64–56
|- align="center" bgcolor="ffbbbb"
| 121 || August 20 || @ Astros || 4–1 || Rodríguez (12–7) || Johnson (12–3) || Valverde (18) || 30,039 || 64–57
|- align="center" bgcolor="bbffbb"
| 122 || August 21 || @ Braves || 5–3 || Sánchez (2–4) || Vázquez (10–9) || Núñez (14) || 22,608 || 65–57
|- align="center" bgcolor="ffbbbb"
| 123 || August 22 || @ Braves || 4–3 || Hanson (9–2) || Volstad (9–10) || Soriano (19) || 35,200 || 65–58
|- align="center" bgcolor="ffbbbb"
| 124 || August 23 || @ Braves || 7–5 || Moylan (6–2) || Calero (2–2) || Soriano (20) || 30,478 || 65–59
|- align="center" bgcolor="bbffbb"
| 125 || August 25 || Mets || 2–1 || West (5–5) || Figueroa (1–3) || Núñez (15) || 14,278 || 66–59
|- align="center" bgcolor="bbffbb"
| 126 || August 26 || Mets || 5–3 || Johnson (13–3) || Pelfrey (9–9) || Núñez (16) || 16,123 || 67–59
|- align="center" bgcolor="ffbbbb"
| 127 || August 27 || Mets || 10–3 || Redding (2–4) || Sánchez (2–5) || || 12,423 || 67–60
|- align="center" bgcolor="ffbbbb"
| 128 || August 28 || Padres || 9–5 || Correia (9–10) || Volstad (9–11) || || 14,402 || 67–61
|- align="center" bgcolor="ffbbbb"
| 129 || August 29 || Padres || 7–4 || Russell (1–0) || Ayala (1–5) || Bell (31) || 20,924 || 67–62
|- align="center" bgcolor="bbffbb"
| 130 || August 30 || Padres || 6–4 || West (6–5) || Latos (4–4) || Núñez (17) || 12,873 || 68–62
|- align="center" bgcolor="ffbbbb"
| 131 || August 31 || Braves || 5–2 || Kawakami (7–10) || Johnson (13–4) || || 12,244 || 68–63
|-

|- bgcolor="ffbbbb"
|- align="center" bgcolor="ffbbbb"
| 132 || September 1 || Braves || 4–3 || Hudson (1–0) || Sánchez (2–6) || Soriano (21) || 14,024 || 68–64
|- align="center" bgcolor=bbffbb
| 133 || September 2 || Braves || 8–7 || Núñez (4–4) || Gonzalez (3–4) || || 14,723 || 69–64
|- align="center" bgcolor=bbffbb
| 134 || September 3 || Braves || 8–3 || Nolasco (10–8) || Medlen (3–5) || || 13,711 || 70–64
|- align="center" bgcolor="bbffbb"
| 135 || September 4 || @ Nationals || 9–6 || Badenhop (6–4) || Mock (3–7) || Núñez (18) || 16,364 || 71–64
|- align="center" bgcolor="bbffbb"
| 136 || September 5 || @ Nationals || 9–5 || Johnson (14–4) || Hernández (7–10) || || 18,111 || 72–64
|- align="center" bgcolor="ffbbbb"
| 137 || September 6 || @ Nationals || 5–4 || MacDougal (1–0) || Núñez (4–5) || || 22,325 || 72–65
|- align="center" bgcolor="bbffbb"
| 138 || September 8 || @ Mets || 4–2 || Sanches (4–1) || Redding (2–5) || Núñez (19) || 37,474 || 73–65
|- align="center" bgcolor="bbffbb"
| 139 || September 9 || @ Mets || 6–3 || Nolasco (11–8) || Misch (1–2) || Núñez (20) || 37,312 || 74–65
|- align="center" bgcolor="bbffbb"
| 140 || September 10 || @ Mets || 13–4 || Badenhop (7–4) || Parnell (3–8) || || 37,620 || 75–65
|- align="center" bgcolor="ffbbbb"
| 141 || September 11 || Nationals || 5–3 || Martin (4–4) || Sanches (4–2) || MacDougal (15) || 15,247 || 75–66
|- align="center" bgcolor="bbffbb"
| 142 || September 12 || Nationals || 11–3 || Wood (1–0) || Estrada (0–1) || || 38,214 || 76–66
|- align="center" bgcolor="ffbbbb"
| 143 || September 13 || Nationals || 7–2 || Lannan (9–11) || Volstad (9–12) || || 15,065 || 76–67
|- align="center" bgcolor="ffbbbb"
| 144 || September 14 || @ Cardinals || 11–6 || Hawksworth (4–0) || Nolasco (11–9) || || 43,582 || 76–68
|- align="center" bgcolor="bbffbb"
| 145 || September 15 || @ Cardinals || 2–1 || West (7–5) || Wainwright (18–8) || Núñez (21) || 42,895 || 77–68
|- align="center" bgcolor="bbffbb"
| 146 || September 16 || @ Cardinals || 5–2 || Johnson (15–4) || Piñeiro (14–11) || Núñez (22) || 43,020 || 78–68
|- align="center" bgcolor="ffbbbb"
| 147 || September 17 || @ Reds || 3–2 || Maloney (1–4) || Sánchez (2–7) || Cordero (38) || 9,685 || 78–69
|- align="center" bgcolor="bbffbb"
| 148 || September 18 || @ Reds || 4–3 || Donnelly (3–0) || Cordero (2–6) || Núñez (23) || 15,882 || 79–69
|- align="center" bgcolor="bbffbb"
| 149 || September 19 || @ Reds || 3–2 || Nolasco (12–9) || Arroyo (13–13) || Lindstrom (15) || 17,026 || 80–69
|- align="center" bgcolor="ffbbbb"
| 150 || September 20 || @ Reds || 8–1 || Wells (8–6) || West (2–4) || || 16,186 || 80–70
|- align="center" bgcolor="bbbbbb"
| || September 21 || Phillies || colspan=6 |Postponed (rain) Rescheduled Sep 21, (doubleheader, 1st game)
|- align="center" bgcolor="ffbbbb"
| 151 || September 22 || Phillies || 9–3 || Blanton (11–7) || Johnson (15–5) || || || 80–71
|- align="center" bgcolor="bbffbb"
| 152 || September 22 || Phillies || 3–0 || Sánchez (3–7) || Moyer (12–10) || Núñez (24) || 20,039 || 81–71
|- align="center" bgcolor="bbffbb"
| 153 || September 23 || Phillies || 7–6 || Meyer (3–1) || Lidge (0–8) || || 31,042 || 82–71
|- align="center" bgcolor="ffbbbb"
| 154 || September 25 || Mets || 6–5 || Parnell (4–8) || Núñez (4–6) || Rodríguez (34) || 39,031 || 82–72
|- align="center" bgcolor="bbffbb"
| 155 || September 26 || Mets || 9–6 || West (8–6) || Maine (6–6) || Donnelly (1) || 35,666 || 83–72
|- align="center" bgcolor="ffbbbb"
| 156 || September 27 || Mets || 4–0 || Misch (2–4) || Volstad (9–13) || || 31,167 || 83–73
|- align="center" bgcolor="ffbbbb"
| 157 || September 28 || @ Braves || 4–0 || Jurrjens (14–10) || Sánchez (3–8) || || 25,046 || 83–74
|- align="center" bgcolor="bbffbb"
| 158 || September 29 || @ Braves || 5–4 || Pinto (4–1) || Kawakami (7–12) || Núñez (25) || 28,669 || 84–74
|- align="center" bgcolor="bbffbb"
| 159 || September 30 || @ Braves || 5–4 || Nolasco (13–9) || Vázquez (15–10) || Donnelly (2) || 31,513 || 85–74
|-

|- bgcolor="ffbbbb"
|- align="center" bgcolor="bbffbb"
| 160 || October 2 || @ Phillies || 7–2 || VandenHurk (3–2) || Blanton (12–8) || || 45,135 || 86–74
|- align="center" bgcolor="bbffbb"
| 161 || October 3 || @ Phillies || 4–3 || Sánchez (4–8) || Hamels (10–11) || Núñez (26) || 45,141 || 87–74
|- align="center" bgcolor="ffbbbb"
| 162 || October 4 || @ Phillies || 7 – 6 (10) || Durbin (2–2) || Meyer (3–2) || || 45,211 || 87–75
|-

Roster

Player stats

Batting
Note: G = Games played; AB = At bats; R = Runs scored; H = Hits; 2B = Doubles; 3B = Triples; HR = Home runs; RBI = Runs batted in; AVG = Batting average; SB = Stolen bases

Note: Pitchers batting data are included above.

Pitching
Note: G = Games pitched; GS = Games started; W = Wins; L = Losses; SV = Saves; IP = Innings pitched; H =Hits; ER = Earned runs allowed; BB = Walks allowed;  K = Strikeouts; ERA = Earned run average;

Farm system

LEAGUE CHAMPIONS: Jacksonville

References

External links

2009 Florida Marlins schedule at MLB.com
2009 Florida Marlins season at Baseball Reference

Miami Marlins seasons
Florida Marlins season
Miami